Aventuras En El Tiempo En Vivo is a second soundtrack for the Mexican television series Aventuras En El Tiempo ("Adventures In Time"), it was released in Mexico by Fonovisa. This was the second material recorded thanks to the same telenovela, the which contains themes different at previous, and something similar but in different versions, the sales were spectacular in the same way the big final of closing of the telenovela in the Fundidora Park in Monterrey. The CD contains the music in live from the serie performed for the cast, including Belinda, Christopher, Maribel Guardia, Ernesto D'alesio.

Track listing 

Television soundtracks
2001 soundtrack albums

pt:Anexo:Trilha sonora de Aventuras en el Tiempo